Gerald Lind Sensabaugh Jr. (born June 13, 1983) is a former American football safety. He was drafted by the Jacksonville Jaguars in the fifth round of the 2005 NFL Draft. He also played for the Dallas Cowboys. He played college football at North Carolina and East Tennessee State University.

Early years
Sensabaugh attended Dobyns-Bennett High School, where he contributed to the Indians reaching 2 Class 5A Semifinals. As a junior, he was a two-way player, making 10 receptions for 166 yards and one touchdown. As a senior, he tallied 42 receptions for 420 yards and 7 touchdowns. He received All-Big Nine and All-Big East Conference honors at defensive back.

In track, he won the long jump state championship in 2000, with a leap of 7.25 meters. He was also the runner-up in the triple jump, with a leap of 14.05 meters.

College career
Sensabaugh accepted a football scholarship from East Tennessee State University. As a true freshman, he started eleven games at safety, registering 53 tackles (4 for loss), 3 sacks, 2 interceptions, 3 passes defensed and one forced fumble. He had 11 tackles and 2 sacks against Charleston Southern University. He made 8 solo tackles against Georgia Southern University.

As a sophomore, he appeared in 11 games, starting 9 at strong safety. He missed one contest with a broken thumb. He totaled 56 tackles (fifth on the team), 4 tackles for loss, one interception, 3 passes defensed, 2 forced fumbles, 4 fumble recoveries (second in the conference) and 2 blocked kicks. He returned a fumble for a 20-yard touchdown against Wofford College. He returned an interception for a 32-yard touchdown against Western Carolina University.

As a junior, he started at strong safety. He posted 74 tackles (fourth on the team), 2 sacks, 2 tackles for loss, 8 passes defensed, 3 forced fumbles, one fumble recovery for a touchdown and 5 blocked punts (school and conference record). He tied an NCAA single-game record after blocking 3 punts against Georgia Southern University. His blocked kicks led to 15 of his team's 22 total points.

Finished fourth on the team with 74 tackles, had two tackles for losses, two sacks, three forced fumbles, one fumble recovery • Broke up eight passes and had a team-high five blocked kicks • Tied an NCAA record with three blocked punts against Georgia Southern.

As a senior in 2004, he transferred to the University of North Carolina, when East Tennessee State University disbanded its football program. He started at strong safety, registering 78 tackles (led the team), 3 sacks, 6.5 tackles for loss, one interception and 5 passes defensed.

Professional career
At the 2005 NFL Scouting Combine, Sensabaugh recorded a best ever in the vertical jump with a 46.0 (inches) vertical.

Jacksonville Jaguars
Sensabaugh was selected by the Jacksonville Jaguars in the fifth round (157th overall) of the 2005 NFL Draft. He was a backup until passing Deke Cooper on the depth chart and starting at strong safety the last 3 contests (including the playoffs). He had 31 defensive tackles and 6 special teams tackles (tied for seventh on the team).

In 2006, he suffered an ankle injury in training camp that forced to miss all of the preseason. He made his first start of the season as team opened up in the nickel defense in the seventh game against the Philadelphia Eagles. He made six starts at strong safety after Donovin Darius was placed on the injured reserve list on November 22. He posted 47 tackles, 2 interceptions (tied for second on the team), one fumble recovery, 11 special teams tackles (tied for third on the team) and one blocked punt.

In 2007, he opened the season as the starter at free safety. He was the starter at strong safety in the second game against the Atlanta Falcons, until suffering a shoulder injury in the first quarter. He played in only 2 games after being placed on the injured reserve list on September 19. He had 8 tackles and one forced fumble. He was replaced with Sammy Knight.

In 2008, he started 13 games (10 at strong safety and 3 at free safety). He made 82 tackles (fifth on the team), 4 interceptions (tied for first on the team), 4 passes defensed, 2 quarterback hurries, 6 special teams tackles (sixth on the team) and a blocked kick.

Sensabaugh was arrested three times while a member of the Jaguars and wasn't re-signed after his rookie contract expired.

Dallas Cowboys
Based on the recommendation of assistant coach Dave Campo, on March 10, 2009, the Dallas Cowboys signed him to a one-year contract to replace Roy Williams at strong safety. He started 15 games at strong safety, posting 81 tackles (sixth on the team), one interception, 10 passes defensed, 5 special teams tackles and one blocked kick.

In 2010, he appeared in 16 games with 14 starts at strong safety. He recorded 86 tackles (fifth on the team), 2 sacks (tied for fifth on the team), 5 interceptions (tied for the team lead), 9 passes defensed (tied for third on the team) and 4 special teams tackles.

In 2011, he started 16 games at free safety. He finished with 77 tackles (third on the team), 2 interceptions, 4 passes defensed, 2 forced fumbles, 2 fumble recoveries, 4 special teams tackles and one blocked kick. Sensabaugh had signed one-year contracts until December 9, when he received a 5-year contract extension from the Cowboys after years of showing the versatility to play both safety positions and special teams.

In 2012, he started 15 games at free safety. He registered 62 tackles (ninth on the team), 6 passes defensed (tied for third on the team), one forced fumble, 5 special teams tackles and it was the first year as a Cowboy that he didn't register an interception.

On March 4, 2013, Sensabaugh was released from the Cowboys in an effort to save cap space. On May 9, 2013, he signed a one-day deal in order to allow him to retire a Dallas Cowboy. He became a starter since being signed, missed only two games in his Cowboys career and dealt each season, with the uncertainty of who would start at the other safety position, having to play with different teammates that included: Ken Hamlin, Alan Ball, Abram Elam, Barry Church, Danny McCray and Eric Frampton.

NFL career statistics

Personal life
Sensabaugh 's cousin, Coty Sensabaugh, also played in the National Football League. In 2014, he started fishing in the Bassmaster Open Series with Team Leiand and attempted to qualify for the Elite Series.

In 2017, he coached football in David Crockett High School. In October, he was placed on administrative leave, due to an investigation into alleged misconduct. Sensabaugh opted to file a law suit against the county for false allegations.

Political life
In 2018, he ran for Mayor of Sullivan County, Tennessee as an independent where he lost to incumbent Richard Venable 17,307 - 7,507 votes. He also ran for an alderman of Kingsport, Tennessee position in 2021, but placed 8th with only 936 votes.

Electoral history

References

External links
 East Tennessee State Buccaneers bio
 North Carolina Tar Heels bio
 Jacksonville Jaguars bio

1983 births
Living people
People from Kingsport, Tennessee
American football safeties
East Tennessee State Buccaneers football players
North Carolina Tar Heels football players
Jacksonville Jaguars players
Dallas Cowboys players
Players of American football from Tennessee
High school football coaches in Tennessee